Nemo A534 was a German Shepherd dog who served in the United States Air Force during the Vietnam War.

December 4, 1966
Tan Son Nhut Air Base, where Nemo was stationed, fell under attack by the Viet Cong in the early hours of December 4, 1966. Nemo would be released to attack Viet Cong later in the night, in the process losing one eye and suffering a gunshot wound to the nose. A bullet would enter under his right eye and exit through his mouth. Despite his severe injuries, Nemo would save the life of his handler, Airman Robert A. Throneburg, who had also been wounded. Crawling across Throneburg's body, Nemo guarded his handler against any who dared to come near until medical help could arrive.

In the darkest of hot nights, Airman Robert Throneburg and Sentry Dog Nemo quietly patrolled near a graveyard on Tan Son Nhut Airbase on the night of December 4, 1966. While on duty, Nemo alerted Throneburg to a group of hidden VC. "Watch him," said Airman Throneburg. The dog's muscles tensed for action. "Get him!" -- was the next command and Nemo lunged savagely forward, into the enemy's nest. Airman Throneburg followed close behind.

In the first moments of the encounter, Airman Throneburg and Nemo killed two of the VC. But, before any additional security police could reach them, Airman Throneburg was wounded in the front left side of his shoulder and then diverted by that bullet saving him from a mortal wound from another incoming round that would have hit his heart, but which lodged only in the back of his left shoulder. After being medevaced, Tan Son Nhut, was liberated.

Airman Robert Throneburg received two Purple Hearts and the Bronze Star Medal with the V for valour (BSV). Nemo was one of the first K-9 units retired and returned to the US.

Later life
Due to his heroic actions, after receiving his injuries Nemo was returned to Lackland Air Force Base  in the United States where he was given a permanent retirement kennel. He continued working as a recruiting dog and died in December 1972 at Lackland  where his memorial kennels and stone stand today in his honour.

See also
 List of individual dogs

References

1972 animal deaths
Dog monuments
German shepherds
Individual dogs in the United States
Military animals